Bystřice nad Pernštejnem is a town in Žďár nad Sázavou District in the Vysočina Region of the Czech Republic. It has about 7,800 inhabitants.

Administrative parts
Villages of Bratrušín, Divišov, Domanín, Domanínek, Dvořiště, Karasín, Kozlov, Lesoňovice, Pivonice, Rovné and Vítochov are administrative parts.

Etymology
The name Bystřice is derived from bystřina, which is a term for a steep, fast flowing stream. The local watercourse was originally called Říčka (i.e. "small river") and later renamed after the town. In 1881, nad Pernštýnem was added to the name to distinguish from other places with the same name, and in 1825 it was modified to nad Pernštejnem. It refers to the nearby Pernštejn Castle.

Geography
It lies on the small river Bystřice. On the north, the municipal territory borders Vír I Reservoir.

Žďár nad Sázavou lies in the Upper Svratka Highlands.

History
The first written mention of Bystřice is from 1238. It was founded by Lords of Medlov during the colonization in the 13th century. In the 14th century, it became the administrative, economic and commercial centre of the surrounding villages in Pernštejn dominion. In 1348, it was first referred to as a market town.

In 1446, Bystřice became a property of the Pernštejn family. During their rule, it gained various privileges and rapidly developed. Bystřice was promoted to a town by Rudolf II in 1580. By this occasion the town received its coat of arms. The owners of the town changed frequently after 1588 when it was sold by Jan V of Pernštejn. The prosperity was interrupted by frequent fires. The most destructive fires occurred in 1585, 1666 and 1841.

In 1905, the town was connected by railway with Žďár nad Sázavou and Tišnov which contributed to development of local industry. The town also benefited from the development of uranium industry in Dolní Rožínka.

The Jewish population disappeared as a result of the Holocaust and after the World War II, it was not renewed.

Demographics

Sights

The Church of Saint Lawrence is as old as the town. Originally it was probably a Romanesque structure, rebuilt in the Gothuc style in the 14th century. In the 15th century, it was fortified. Last modifications were made in 1873.

The town hall was first mentioned in 1493. It was rebuilt to its current form in 1808. Today the building houses the town museum.

Notable people
Gustav Pfleger Moravský (1833–1875), writer and poet
Otto Eisler (1893–1968), architect

Twin towns – sister cities

Bystřice nad Pernštejnem is twinned with:
 Boguchwała, Poland
 Crimmitschau, Germany

 Vranov nad Topľou, Slovakia

Gallery

References

External links

Cities and towns in the Czech Republic
Populated places in Žďár nad Sázavou District